Marthinus Riaan Stefanus 'Pellow' van der Westhuizen (born 3 February 1984) is a South African rugby union footballer. He plays mostly as a hooker.

He joined French team Colomiers after the 2012 season.

References

Living people
1984 births
South African rugby union players
Rugby union hookers
Afrikaner people
Pumas (Currie Cup) players
Sharks (Currie Cup) players
People from Uitenhage
Leopards (rugby union) players
Rugby union players from the Eastern Cape